Jacques Lanfranchi (27 December 1957 – 23 November 2011) was a French sport shooter. He competed at the 1988 Summer Olympics in the mixed skeet event, in which he tied for 20th place. He was born in Ouagadougou.

References

1957 births
2011 deaths
Skeet shooters
French male sport shooters
Shooters at the 1988 Summer Olympics
Olympic shooters of France